Nanticoke Creek is a watercourse in Haldimand County, Ontario.

The small village of Nanticoke, Ontario, was founded at its mouth between 1830 and 1850.  The Nanticoke were a dependent nation of the Iroquois Confederacy.

See also  
List of rivers of Ontario

References

Rivers of Ontario
Geography of Haldimand County
Long Point Region Conservation Authority